Enry Juan Barale (born 16 November 1941) is an Argentine former footballer.

Career
He started his professional career playing for Banfield on May 19, 1963. Boca Juniors bought his rights in 1964, but he did not have a lot of opportunities to play there. In 1965, Osvaldo Zubeldía, the new coach of Estudiantes de La Plata, convinced him to join the team. He flourished in Estudiantes, where he was a fundamental piece of the team that won the 1967 Metropolitano Championship. Unfortunately, he got seriously injured (ACL) during the 4–3 victory in the semifinal game against Platense. That injury plagued him through the rest of his career. He was able to play again in 1968, playing in only 12 games; but he retired soon after that, playing for Deportivo Morón of the Argentine second division.

References

1941 births
Living people
Association football defenders
Argentine footballers
Boca Juniors footballers
Pan American Games medalists in football
Pan American Games silver medalists for Argentina
Footballers at the 1963 Pan American Games
Medalists at the 1963 Pan American Games